Owen Wilfried Medlock (8 March 1938 – 17 October 2021) is an English former footballer who played for Oxford United, Chelsea and Swindon Town. He made a total of 133 appearances for Oxford, and was in goal for their first Football League fixture.

References

External links
 Rage Online profile
 

1938 births
2021 deaths
People from Whittlesey
English footballers
Association football goalkeepers
English Football League players
Chelsea F.C. players
Swindon Town F.C. players
Oxford United F.C. players
Chelmsford City F.C. players